169th meridian may refer to:

169th meridian east, a line of longitude east of the Greenwich Meridian
169th meridian west, a line of longitude west of the Greenwich Meridian